Elizabeth Hawkins-Whitshed (26 June 1860 – 27 July 1934), usually known after her third marriage as Mrs Aubrey Le Blond and to her climbing friends as Lizzie Le Blond, was an Irish pioneer of mountaineering at a time when it was almost unheard of for a woman to climb mountains. She was also an author and a photographer of mountain scenery.

She came from an upper-class background, being the daughter of Captain Sir St Vincent Hawkins-Whitshed, 3rd Baronet (1837–1871) (see Hawkins-Whitshed baronets) by his wife Anne Alicia (née Handcock) (1837–1908), and further back was descended from the aristocratic Bentinck family, and was therefore related to the Dukes of Portland.

She grew up in Greystones, County Wicklow, in the south-east of Ireland, where her father owned quite a bit of land. However, her father then died, leaving no other children, while she was still a minor, and the Lord Chancellor took her on as his ward.

Elizabeth moved to Switzerland, where she climbed mountains and has since become well known for photos showing her climbing in a skirt.  In 1907, she took the lead in forming the Ladies' Alpine Club and became its first president. She wrote seven books on mountain climbing and over her lifetime made twenty first ascents, conquering peaks that no one had climbed before.

As Mrs Aubrey Le Blond she made at least ten films of alpine activities in the Engadine Valley of Switzerland, including ice hockey at St Moritz and tobogganing on the Cresta Run. She is probably among the world's first three female film-makers, after Alice Guy and contemporary with Laura Bayley. Her films were shown by James Williamson at Hove Town Hall in November 1900, being included in his catalogue in 1902, and were praised by the film pioneer Cecil Hepworth and the writer E. F. Benson.

She married three times: firstly, in 1879, to Frederick Burnaby (1842–1885); secondly, in 1886, to John Frederick Main (died 1892); and thirdly, in 1900, to Francis Bernard Aubrey Le Blond. From her first marriage, she had a son Harry Burnaby, in 1880. Despite her second and third marriages, the lands at Greystones that she had inherited from her father (before marriage) were to be known as the Burnaby Estate. This part of Greystones (The Burnaby) was developed after 1900. It includes Burnaby Road, Somerby Road, as well as Whitshed, St. Vincent's, and Portland Roads, and Hawkins Lane. She published accounts of her climbing under the names Mrs. Fred Burnaby, Mrs. Main, and Mrs. Aubrey Le Blond.

She published her autobiography Day In, Day Out in 1928.

Personal life 
Elizabeth Hawkins-Whitshed was born in Dublin on 26 June 1860. She was the daughter of Captain Vincent Hawkins-Whitshed and Mrs. Anne Hawkins-Whitshed  who raised her in Killincarrick House, Greystones, Co. Wicklow. Elizabeth's childhood was said to be happy in the countryside with a devoted mother, but her father died in 1871 leaving her inherited Killincarrick House along with nearly 2,000 acres of land spreading across Dublin, Meath and Wicklow at the age of eleven years.

Elizabeth could claim kinship with royalty and aristocracy in Europe through her Bentick great grandmother and at the age of eighteen she joined London society and married her first husband Captain Fred Burnaby, a British Army intelligence officer, in 1879. She gave birth to her son Harry Burnaby  in 1880. A few months after the birth, she and her husband began leading primarily separate lives until his death in the battle of Sudan on 17 January 1885.

In the time leading up to his death, Elizabeth had been spending her time searching for a cure to the lung difficulty she was experiencing.

In 1881 she moved to Switzerland.

In 1886, Elizabeth married her second husband John Frederick Main. The marriage was short lived when he died alone in North America in 1892.

In 1900 she married her third husband, Aubrey Le Blond.

She died on 27 July 1934, and was buried at Brompton cemetery in London.

Authorship 
Elizabeth wrote her books under both her former name, Elizabeth Hawkins Whitshed and her latter name of Aubrey Le Blond. She took great joy in the authorship of her books along with her love of photography alike. Her first book was published in 1883, The High Alps of Winter, the precursor to a series of books and articles describing her mountaineering experiences. However, she would later decide to turn her hand to fiction, travel writing and family history. Although her talent for writing books was evident, she was most fond of photography, carrying her camera on her shoulder everywhere she went. Between her most widely known hobbies of mountaineering, photography and writing books, there are currently 69 works in 220 publications in 3 languages and 2,228 library holdings known, worldwide.

Mountaineering 

Abandoning conventional mid 1880s London lifestyle, Mrs. Hawkins ended up in Chamonix where her first climb was making two thirds up of the way up Mont Blanc. She is known now for the photos of her climbing a skirt, however she would change when out of public sight to avoid causing offence. The interior of her tent at the bottom of most mountains she climbed gave us an idea of her social status: nice clothing, a comfortable bed, drapes, and her own elaborate toilette can be found inside. Her health declined due to trouble in her lungs, but that did not prevent her from going on expeditions. On the contrary, her time spent abroad was also used in search for a cure, and this activity pushed her to better herself.

In the summer of 1881, she moved to Switzerland at the heart of European mountaineering. During that summer, Hawkins scaled the Mont Blanc twice and several other difficult peaks in Switzerland within twenty years. Further down her career, Elizabeth abandoned Switzerland for Lapland and Norway. Spending six consecutive summers in the Norwegian Arctic shined light on uncharted territory. This led to Hawkins completing over one hundred ascents, twenty of which were first ascents. During her expeditions. however, Hawkins would take advantage of her wealth and social status by being accompanied by personal staff. To prove how dangerous the conditions can get during ascents, Elizabeth's personal maid once had to be carried out their carriage when it was completely covered in ice.

In 1907, Hawkins set up and became the first president of the Ladies Alpine Club. She showed great courage and provided inspiration to future generations for females taking part in activities deemed masculine.

Photography 

Almost from the beginning of her climbing career Elizabeth carried her camera with her, capturing views which had never been seen before  she also took up photography and was an early adopter of snow photography 

Over the years she took thousands of photographs, about four hundred of which were included in various publications, Including Water, its Origin and Use by William Coles Finch. Elizabeth developed and printed her own work often in terrible conditions and would sell them in aid of charity, give them as gifts, or give them as a prize at mountaineering events. Sadly very little of Elizabeth's  photography work is left from her days mountaineering and traveling.

An exhibition was held at the Pontresina Alpine Museum in 2003 and a collection of her photographs published in a volume which the Greystones Historical Society presented to the local library during National Heritage Week 2011.

Selected works
The high Alps in winter, or mountaineering in search of health – published 1883 
Mountaineering in the Land of the Midnight Sun
Adventures on the Roof of the World
True Tales of Mountain Adventure: For non-climbers Young and Old
My Home in the Alps
High Life of Towers and Silence
Charlotte Sophie, Countess Bentick: Her Life and times, 1715–1800
The Old Gardens of Italy How to Visit them
Day In, Day Out

References

Sources
 Brief biography of "Miss Main" – in German
 History of Greystones in County Wicklow – with information on the Burnaby Estate and the Hawkins-Whitshed family
 Descendants of Willem Bentinck and Charlotte Sophie of Aldenburg by Hein Bruins – source for family information
Peter H. Hansen, ‘Le Blond, Elizabeth Alice Frances (1860–1934)’, Oxford Dictionary of National Biography, Oxford University Press, September 2004; online edn, October 2006
 Raughter, R. (2012). 'A Victorian Lady in the High Alps, Elizabeth Hawkins-Witshed of Killincarrick.

 Murtagh P. (2013) Victorian-era Women photographers celebrated
 MacLachlan, J. M. (2004). Peak performances: Cultural and autobiographical constructions of the Victorian female mountaineer (Order No. NQ90225). Available from ProQuest Dissertations & Theses A&I. (305057898). Retrieved from 
 Raughter, R. (2012). A Victorian Lady in the High Alps, Elizabeth Hawkins-Witshed of Killincarrick. Our Wicklow Heritage, Greystones Archaeological and Historical Society. Retrieved from 
 Le, E. A. F. H. W., & Le Blond, M. A. (1883). The High alps in Winter: Or, Mountaineering in Search of Health. S. Low, Marston, Searle, & Rivington
 Siggins, L. (2013, Dec 09). "An Irishwoman's diary". The Irish Times Retrieved from 
  Countywicklowheritage.org. (2017). A Victorian Lady in the High Alps | Elizabeth Hawkins-Whitshed of Killincarrick ''| People | County Wicklow Heritage.

External links

1860 births
1934 deaths
Women autobiographers
Irish mountain climbers
Irish photographers
Irish women photographers
Irish artists
Greystones
Presidents of the Ladies' Alpine Club
Female climbers
Irish autobiographers
Daughters of baronets